Mary H. Boergers (born February 10, 1946) is an American politician and educator. She was appointed to a seat on the Maryland House of Delegates in 1981, and served until 1990, when she won election to the Maryland Senate. During Boergers's political career, she represented the 17th and 18th districts of Maryland. She was highly involved in Maryland politics, especially concerned with issues of education, drugs and crime, environment, labor, and women's concerns.

Early life and education 
Boergers was born in Hartford, Connecticut, on February 10, 1946. Her mother was a high school teacher and her father was an auditor for an insurance company. Her family later moved to Minneapolis, Minnesota.

Boergers attended the College of St. Catherine in St. Paul, Minnesota and graduated with her Bachelors of Arts in 1968. After graduating, she moved to Washington, D.C. to attend Catholic University of America, earning a Masters of Arts in American History in 1970.

Career 
Mary Boergers taught high school history at Rockville High School in Montgomery County, Maryland. She later was a lobbyist for the National Organization for Women and fund raised for Rep. Michael Barnes. Boergers continued to engage herself in politics, particularly in the areas of education, drugs and crime, environment, labor, and women's concerns.

In 1981, Mary Boergers was appointed to the Maryland House of Delegates, representing the 18th district. She replaced David L. Scull who resigned from the role. She was a member of the Ways and Means Committee (1981-1988), House of Delegates (1983-1990), and the Economic Matters Committee (1988-1990). She was the president of Women Legislators of Maryland from 1990 to 1991.

In 1990, Boergers was elected to the Maryland Senate seat representing 17th district and served from 1991 to 1994. She ran on a pro-choice platform against a pro-life candidate.

Boergers ran for Governor of Maryland in 1994. Her running mate was Barbara Osborn Kreamer; they were the first all-female top ticket in Maryland. Boergers received 9% of the democratic primary votes, losing the primary election to the later elected Parris Glendening.

Personal life 
Mary Boergers is married to David Boergers and they have two children.

References 

1946 births
Politicians from Hartford, Connecticut
St. Catherine University alumni
Catholic University of America alumni
Democratic Party members of the Maryland House of Delegates
Living people
Schoolteachers from Maryland
20th-century American women politicians
Women state legislators in Maryland
20th-century American educators
20th-century American politicians
American lobbyists
National Organization for Women people
20th-century American women educators